Anthony Roy Low (born 8 July 1944 in Watford) is an English former professional footballer who played for Tottenham Hotspur, Watford, Bedford Town and represented England at schoolboy level.

Playing career
Low joined Tottenham Hotspur as a junior in July 1961. He went on to make eight appearances and scored one goal. The winger became the first Spurs player to make a substitute appearance when he replaced Derek Possee in a home fixture against Arsenal on 11 September 1965. In February 1967 Low signed for Watford and played in a further 26 first team matches and found the net on four occasions. After leaving Vicarage Road he went on to play for Bedford Town where he ended his senior career.

References

External links

1944 births
Living people
Sportspeople from Watford
English footballers
English Football League players
Tottenham Hotspur F.C. players
Watford F.C. players
Bedford Town F.C. players
Association football wingers